Andrés Felipe Arboleda Hurtado (born April 13, 1987) is a Colombian footballer who plays for Cortulua.

He can play as defensive midfielder. He was a starter on the Colombian Sub 20 that failed to qualify for the 2007 World Cup. he has also played for América de Cali and Deportivo Pereira.

External links
 BDFA profile

1987 births
Living people
Colombian footballers
Categoría Primera A players
Categoría Primera B players
América de Cali footballers
Deportivo Pereira footballers
Cortuluá footballers
Atlético Bucaramanga footballers
Patriotas Boyacá footballers
Cúcuta Deportivo footballers
Jaguares de Córdoba footballers
Association football midfielders